Yuji Fujita ( is a Japanese mixed martial artist.

Mixed martial arts record

|-
| Loss
| align=center| 1–6
| Caol Uno
| Decision (unanimous)
| Shooto - Las Grandes Viajes 2
| 
| align=center| 2
| align=center| 5:00
| Tokyo, Japan
| 
|-
| Loss
| align=center| 1–5
| Mohammad Jarban
| Decision (unanimous)
| Shooto - Reconquista 2
| 
| align=center| 2
| align=center| 5:00
| Tokyo, Japan
| 
|-
| Loss
| align=center| 1–4
| Hiroyuki Kojima
| Decision (unanimous)
| Shooto - Reconquista 1
| 
| align=center| 3
| align=center| 3:00
| Kawasaki, Kanagawa, Japan
| 
|-
| Win
| align=center| 1–3
| Yuzo Tateishi
| Decision (unanimous)
| Shooto - Free Fight Kawasaki
| 
| align=center| 3
| align=center| 3:00
| Tokyo, Japan
| 
|-
| Loss
| align=center| 0–3
| Tomoaki Hayama
| Submission (rear naked choke)
| Shooto - Vale Tudo Junction 3
| 
| align=center| 2
| align=center| 2:25
| Tokyo, Japan
| 
|-
| Loss
| align=center| 0–2
| Takuya Kuwabara
| Technical Submission (armbar)
| Shooto - Vale Tudo Junction 1
| 
| align=center| 2
| align=center| 2:15
| Tokyo, Japan
| 
|-
| Loss
| align=center| 0–1
| Yasunori Okuda
| Submission (armbar)
| Shooto - Shooto
| 
| align=center| 1
| align=center| 0:25
| Tokyo, Japan
|

See also
List of male mixed martial artists

References

External links
 
 Yuji Fujita at mixedmartialarts.com
 Yuji Fujita at fightmatrix.com

Japanese male mixed martial artists
Living people
Year of birth missing (living people)